Tricia Dickson (born January 3, 1982) is an American voice actress. For a brief time, she was also a cast member of the Nickelodeon sketch comedy series, All That.

Roles

Anime
Angel Tales - Akane the Fox
Girls Bravo - Lilica Stacy, Narration, Student C (ep. 2)
Haibane Renmei - Haibane of Abandoned Factory
Hellsing - Integra Hellsing (young)
Ikki Tousen - Shimei Ryomou
Melody of Oblivion - Toune Requiem
NieA Under 7 - Mayuko Chigasaki
Read or Die - Wendy Earhart
R.O.D. the TV - Nenene Sumiregawa
Spirit of Wonder Scientific Boys Club - Windy
Starship Girl Yamamoto Yohko II - Sylvie Dread
I My Me! Strawberry Eggs - Ai Mikage

Other
Disfigured (2008) - Cordelia
Even Stevens (2002) - Lady Jane (Episode: The King Sloppy)
Rave (2000) - Trace
The Secret Kingdom (1998) - Callie Fremont
All That (1997) - Player

References

External links

 

1982 births
20th-century American actresses
21st-century American actresses
Actresses from Pennsylvania
American child actresses
American television actresses
American video game actresses
American voice actresses
Living people
Actors from Reading, Pennsylvania